Joy Claire Allison Dalby (born 20 November 1944) is a British artist and book illustrator who mainly depicts botanical subjects and who works in watercolours, gouache and wood engraving.

Biography
Dalby, whose father was the respected watercolour painter Charles Longbotham, was born in St Andrews in Scotland. She attended the Haberdashers' Aske's School for Girls at Acton in west London from 1955 to 1963. Dalby studied art, specialising in engraving and calligraphy, at the City and Guilds of London Art School from 1964 to 1967. In 1966 she had her first picture exhibited at the Royal Academy in London. Dalby exhibited at the Clarges Gallery in 1968 and in 1972. A number of solo exhibitions followed including at Camberley in Surrey during 1975, at Halifax House in Oxford in 1987 and at the Consort Gallery of Imperial College in both 1981 and 1988. Also in 1988 Dalby had a solo exhibition at the Shetland Museum in Lerwick. She has participated in a number of group shows including exhibitions organised by the Society of Wood Engravers, the Royal Watercolour Society and the Royal Society of Painter-Etchers and Engravers. Dalby provided botanical illustrations for a number of books and created two wallcharts, illustrating over 500 different species of lichens, for the Natural History Museum. In 1989 a collection of her botanical illustrations was published as Claire Dalby's Picture Book. In 1994 the Linnean Society awarded Dalby their Jill Smythies Award for outstanding botanical illustrations and in 1995 she was awarded a gold medal by the Royal Horticultural Society.

Works by Dalby are held in a number of British museums including the Natural History Museum, the Science Museum, the Victoria and Albert Museum and the Ashmolean Museum in Oxford. The Royal Collection, the Fitzwilliam Museum and the National Library of Wales also hold examples as do the Hunt Institute and the Australian Biological Resources Study Centre in Canberra.

Books illustrated
 The Observer's Book of Lichens by K L Alvin
 The Family Water Naturalist by H Angel & P Wolseley, Joseph, 1982.
 Women Engravers by P Jaffe, 1988.
 Even the Flowers by Freda Downie, Gruffyground Press, 1989, with an engraved frontispiece by Dalby
 Claire Dalby's Picture Book, 1989.
 Colour Identification Guide to Grasses, Sedges and Ferns by F Rose, 1991.
 Crucifers of Great Britain and Northern Ireland by T Rich, 1991.
 Flora of Australia, Volume 54, 1992.
 Images from Nature, Natural History Museum, 1998.

Memberships
Dalby is a member of or affiliated with the following organisations;-
 1973 Elected associate of the Royal Watercolour Society 
 1977 Elected full member of the Royal Watercolour Society
 1978 Elected associate of Royal Society of Painter-Etchers and Engravers.
 1982 Elected full member of Royal Society of Painter-Etchers and Engravers.
 1991 Vice-president of the Royal Watercolour Society.

Dalby is also a member of the Society of Wood Engravers.

References

1944 births
Living people
20th-century Scottish painters
20th-century Scottish women artists
21st-century Scottish painters
21st-century Scottish women artists
Alumni of the City and Guilds of London Art School
People educated at Haberdashers' Girls' School
People from St Andrews
Scottish women artists
Scottish women painters